Charles Fountain Willis, Jr. (July 23, 1918 – March 16, 1993) was an American political campaigner and low level government official.

Willis was born in Beaumont, Texas, and earned a B.A. from the University of Florida in 1939.

During World War II, Willis was a commander in the Naval Air Arm of the United States Navy.  He served as a patrol pilot, a bomber pilot, and a fighter pilot.  His efforts earned the Distinguished Flying Cross three times, three Air Medals, and a Purple Heart.

After the war, Willis entered private industry and founded Willis Air Service in 1946.  In 1951, Willis and Stanley M. Rumbough Jr. co-founded the "Citizens for Eisenhower" movement in an attempt to secure the election of Dwight D. Eisenhower.  Willis continued his work for the Eisenhower campaign in 1952 by joining the campaign staff.  He is credited for coining the iconic political slogan, "I Like Ike."

After Eisenhower's election in late 1952, Willis joined Eisenhower's staff and served as assistant to the assistant to the president from January 23, 1953, until June 30, 1955.

Following Willis' departure from the White House, he served as assistant to the chairman of W. R. Grace and Company until 1957 when he became president of Alaska Airlines.

He was buried at Arlington National Cemetery, in Arlington, Virginia.

References

External links
 Records of Charles F. Willis, Dwight D. Eisenhower Presidential Library
 
 September 2, 1957 Letter from Dwight D. Eisenhower to Charles Fountain Willis, Jr.

University of Florida alumni
United States Naval Aviators
1918 births
1993 deaths
Recipients of the Air Medal
Recipients of the Distinguished Flying Cross (United States)
Burials at Arlington National Cemetery
Texas Republicans
People from Beaumont, Texas
United States Navy personnel of World War II
Military personnel from Texas